Albert Day (November 29, 1797 – November 11, 1876) was an American politician who was the 47th lieutenant governor of Connecticut.

He was the lieutenant governor from 1856 to 1857, during the last of two consecutive one-year terms when William T. Minor was the governor of the state.

References

Lieutenant Governors of Connecticut
1797 births
1876 deaths
Connecticut Know Nothings
Activists from Connecticut